Belkis Ulacio is a Venezuelan politician, currently an alternate deputy of the National Assembly for the Vargas state.

Career 
Ulacio was elected as alternate deputy in the National Assembly for the Vargas state for the 2016-2021 term in the 2015 parliamentary elections, representing the Democratic Unity Roundtable (MUD).

See also 
 IV National Assembly of Venezuela

References

External links 
 
 

Living people
Members of the National Assembly (Venezuela)
21st-century Venezuelan women politicians
21st-century Venezuelan politicians
Year of birth missing (living people)